Antonio Jackson de Oliveira Alcántara (born 22 November 1987, in Brazil), also known as Jackson, is a Brazilian professional footballer.

References

1987 births
Living people
Brazilian footballers
C.D. Dragón footballers
Brazilian expatriate footballers
Expatriate footballers in El Salvador
Association football midfielders